Alakır Dam (in Turkish, Alakır Barajı) is a dam in Antalya Province, Turkey, built between 1967 and .

See also
List of dams and reservoirs in Turkey

External links
Alakır Barajı. DSI.

Dams in Antalya Province
Dams completed in 1971